The 2010 Kvalserien was the 36th Kvalserien, played between 21 March and 11 April 2010. Södertälje and AIK, who finished 1st and 2nd respectively, qualified for the 2010–11 Elitserien season. Rögle were relegated to HockeyAllsvenskan.

This year's Kvalserien was one of the closest ones ever. After the 9th round, four teams (AIK, Rögle, Leksand and Almtuna) all had their chance to qualify for the 2010–11 Elitserien season. After the 9th round, AIK were on the second and last Elitserien spot, being one point ahead of Rögle, who had 15 points at that time. AIK needed a win against Växjö at home in Hovet, in order to secure their last Elitserien spot. In the 10th and final round, AIK won 2–0 against Växjö and thus secured their Elitserien spot. AIK finished the 2010 Kvalserien with 18 points, the lowest number of points a team has ever been able to qualify to Elitserien with, ever since Kvalserien started in 1975.

But only after the 7th round, no one even believed that AIK could qualify. At that time, they were at the third place with 10 points, four points behind Rögle. But Rögle lost their two following games, which AIK won, and AIK were therefore at the last Elitserien spot after the 9th round. Södertälje had already secured their Elitserien spot after the 9th round.

Like previous Kvalserien years, Leksand were once again a big disappointment for everyone. They were at the third place with 13 points after the 8th round, only one point behind Rögle, who were on the last Elitserien spot at that time. But Leksand lost 5–2 away against the last ranked team Växjö in the 9th round, and thus, Leksand were forced to win their last game, which was against Almtuna. Although Leksand did win 2–1 against Almtuna, AIK won 2–0 against Växjö, which meant that Leksand missed Elitserien for the fifth consecutive year.

Standings

Game log 

|-
| rowspan="3" | 1 || rowspan="3" | March 21 || Södertälje SK || 2–0 || Rögle BK || AXA Sports Center || 4,334
|-
| Växjö Lakers HC || 5–6 || AIK IF || Växjö Ishall || 3,096
|-
| Almtuna IS || 4–2 || Leksands IF || Gränbyhallen || 2,805
|-
| rowspan="3" | 2 || rowspan="3" | March 23 || Leksands IF || 4–1 || Växjö Lakers HC || Ejendals Arena || 6,162
|-
| AIK IF || 3–4 || Södertälje SK || Hovet || 5,413
|-
| Rögle BK || 3–2 (SO) || Almtuna IS || Lindab Arena || 4,023
|-
| rowspan="3" | 3 || rowspan="3" | March 25 || Södertälje SK || 3–2 || Leksands IF || AXA Sports Center || 5,976
|-
| Växjö Lakers HC || 2–3 (SO) || Almtuna IS || Växjö Ishall || 2,495
|-
| AIK IF || 2–3 (OT) || Rögle BK || Hovet || 3,847
|-
| rowspan="3" | 4 || rowspan="3" | March 27 || Almtuna IS || 1–3 || Södertälje SK || Gränbyhallen || 2,916
|-
| Leksands IF || 2–1 || AIK IF || Ejendals Arena || 7,650
|-
| Rögle BK || 5–2 || Växjö Lakers HC || Lindab Arena || 4,218
|-
| rowspan="3" | 5 || rowspan="3" | March 29 || Södertälje SK || 7–4 || Växjö Lakers HC || AXA Sports Center || 3,679
|-
| Leksands IF || 3–4 || Rögle BK || Ejendals Arena || 7,650
|-
| AIK IF || 4–1 || Almtuna IS || Hovet || 2,573 
|-

|-
| rowspan="3" | 6 || rowspan="3" | April 2 || Växjö Lakers HC || 7–6 (OT) || Södertälje SK || Växjö Ishall || 2,502
|-
| Almtuna IS || 1–2 || AIK IF || Gränbyhallen || 2,648
|-
| Rögle BK || 1–2 (OT) || Leksands IF || Lindab Arena || 5,150
|-
| rowspan="3" | 7 || rowspan="3" | April 4 || Södertälje SK || 4–3 (OT) || Almtuna IS || AXA Sports Center || 3,664
|-
| Växjö Lakers HC || 3–7 || Rögle BK || Växjö Ishall || 2,954
|-
| AIK IF || 2–3 || Leksands IF || Hovet || 7,023
|-
| rowspan="3" | 8 || rowspan="3" | April 6 || Almtuna IS || 4–0 || Växjö Lakers HC || Gränbyhallen || 1,254
|-
| Leksands IF || 3–2 (OT) || Södertälje SK || Ejendals Arena || 7,650
|-
| Rögle BK || 4–5 || AIK IF || Lindab Arena || 4,989
|-
| rowspan="3" | 9 || rowspan="3" | April 8 || Södertälje SK || 1–2 (OT) || AIK IF || AXA Sports Center || 5,741
|-
| Växjö Lakers HC || 5–2 || Leksands IF || Växjö Ishall || 2,907
|-
| Almtuna IS || 3–1 || Rögle BK || Gränbyhallen || 2,126
|-
| rowspan="3" | 10 || rowspan="3" | April 11 || Leksands IF || 2–1 || Almtuna IS || Ejendals Arena || 6,353
|-
| AIK IF || 2–0 || Växjö Lakers HC || Hovet || 8,079
|-
| Rögle BK || 3–2 (SO) || Södertälje SK || Lindab Arena || 3,745
|-

Kvalserien
Kvalserien